The Great American Music Hall is a concert hall in San Francisco, California. It is located on O'Farrell Street in the Tenderloin neighborhood on the same block as the Mitchell Brothers O'Farrell Theatre. It is known for its decorative balconies, columns, and frescoes and for its history of unique entertainment, which has included burlesque dancing as well as jazz, folk music, and rock and roll concerts.  The capacity of the hall is 470 people.

History

Blanco's and Music Box 
The hall was established in 1907 during the period of rebuilding that followed the 1906 earthquake. Its interior was designed by a French architect. It was originally called Blanco's, after a notorious Barbary Coast house of prostitution.

In 1936, Sally Rand, known for her fan dance and bubble dance acts, acquired the property and branded it the Music Box. It closed with the end of World War II, reopened in 1948 as a jazz club that reused the name Blanco's, and in the 1950s the building was used by members of the Loyal Order of the Moose. The venue went into a long decline that nearly resulted in the demolition of the building.

Great American Music Hall 
In 1972 the venue was purchased by Tom Bradshaw. Newly refurbished and painted, the building was renamed the Great American Music Hall. In 1973-1974 the Stuart Little Band became the GAMH house band and performed as opening act for many GAMH headliners: Cal Tjader, Sarah Vaughan, Carmen McRae, Marcel Marceau, Stan Getz, Mongo Santamaria, Dizzy Gillespie, pianist Bill Evans, Jerry Garcia & Merl Saunders, Joe Pass, Cleo Laine, Herbie Mann, Buddy Rich, the Tubes, etc. In 1974, the new line-up of Journey debuted there, also Jerry Garcia of the Grateful Dead debuted and recorded a live album with Legion of Mary, his jazz influenced rock band in 1974, and again later with the Jerry Garcia Band as well as the Grateful Dead's album One from the Vault. In 1982, Robin Williams filmed his HBO special, "An Evening with Robin Williams". In the early '90s, radio station KKSF 103.7FM hosted several large "Music Without Borders Listener Appreciation Concerts", with performances by Opafire as well as other Contemporary Jazz groups. In May 2000, during the dot-com boom, the venue was acquired for a reportedly seven-figure sum by music website Riffage.com, and went to Diablo Management Group when Riffage.com ceased operations in December 2000. In 2013, the Great American Music Hall was named the sixth-best rock club in America in a Rolling Stone poll of artists and managers.

Live Performances at the Great American Hall

Recordings
The Grateful Dead's album One from the Vault, the first of its "From the Vault" series, was recorded at the Great American Music Hall in August 1975.
David Bromberg recorded portions of How Late'll Ya Play 'Til? at the Great American Music Hall in June 1976.
Ry Cooder recorded Show Time on December 14 & 15, 1976.
McCoy Tyner recorded The Greeting on March 17 & 18, 1978.
Sonny Rollins recorded Don't Stop the Carnival on April 13, 14 & 15, 1978.
Carmen McRae recorded "At The Great American Music Hall" in 1976.
Doc and Merle Watson recorded "Live and Pickin' " on October 11–13, 1978. At the Grammy Awards of 1980 "Big Sandy/Leather Britches" won the Grammy Award for Best Country Instrumental Performance.
Betty Carter recorded her live vocal jazz album The Audience with Betty Carter at the Great American Music Hall in 1979.
The Carmen McRae-Betty Carter Duets recorded on January 30 - Feb 1, 1987 at the Great American Music Hall.
Herbie Mann made a direct-to-disc recording, All Blues/Forest Rain, in 1980.
Carla Bley recorded Live! on August 19–21, 1981.
Robin Williams filmed his 1982 HBO special, "An Evening with Robin Williams" at the Great American Music Hall.
The Radiators (American band) Live at the "Great American Music Hall" in 1998.
Boz Scaggs recorded his CD/DVD Greatest Hits Live in 2004
The Secret Chiefs 3 recorded their DVD Live at the Great American Music Hall in 2007.
Jonathan Coulton recorded his album Best. Concert. Ever. in February 2008.
Fantômas recorded their album and video The Director's Cut Live: A New Year's Revolution on December 31, 2008.
Richard Thompson recorded portions of his album Dream Attic in February 2010.
The Mother Hips Live at the Great American Music Hall December 15-16 2017
Ry Cooder recorded his 2011 concert with Corridos Famosos at the Great American Music Hall Billy Joel recorded “New York State of Mind” at the Great American Music Hall 1975 Released on Spotify,et al, 11/04/2021

References

External links 
 Sally Rand and The Music Box at Virtual Museum of SF
 Great American Music homepage on the website of Slim's Presents

Jazz clubs in the San Francisco Bay Area
Music venues in San Francisco
Nightclubs in San Francisco
Buildings and structures completed in 1907
Music venues completed in 1907
1907 establishments in California